Uwe Christian Kreyssig (28 September 1930 in Chemnitz – 17 May 2008 in Havelsee) was a German operatic baritone, opera director and television presenter.

Bibliography 
 Karl-Josef Kutsch, Leo Riemens: Großes Sängerlexikon. Vierte, extended and updated edition. Munich 2003. Volume 4: Kainz–Menkes. . .
 Wilhelm Kosch (editor): Deutsches Theaterlexikon. Nachtragsband, Part 3. K – L. De Gruyter, Berlin. . December 2014. .

References

External links 
 

1930 births
2008 deaths
People from Chemnitz
German operatic baritones
German opera directors
German television presenters
20th-century German male opera singers